Yakovlevsky is a rural locality (a khutor) in Verkhnekhotemlsky Selsoviet Rural Settlement, Fatezhsky District, Kursk Oblast, Russia. Population:

Geography 
The khutor is located on the Umsky Brook in the basin of the Svapa, 101 km from the Russia–Ukraine border, 34.5 km north-west of Kursk, 10 km south-east of the district center – the town Fatezh, 2.5 km from the selsoviet center – Verkhny Khoteml.

 Climate
Yakovlevsky has a warm-summer humid continental climate (Dfb in the Köppen climate classification).

Transport 
Yakovlevsky is located on the federal route  Crimea Highway as part of the European route E105, 11 km from the road of regional importance  (Fatezh – Dmitriyev), 26 km from the road  (Kursk – Ponyri), 3 km from the road  (Fatezh – 38K-018), 2.5 km from the road of intermunicipal significance  (M2 "Crimea Highway" – Kosilovo, with the access road to Dobrokhotovo), 30 km from the nearest railway halt 521 km (railway line Oryol – Kursk).

The rural locality is situated 37 km from Kursk Vostochny Airport, 157 km from Belgorod International Airport and 229 km from Voronezh Peter the Great Airport.

References

Notes

Sources

Rural localities in Fatezhsky District